Balhaego is a history book about the Balhae civilization, written by Yu Deuk-gong, who was a Silhak (practical studies) scholar during the Joseon Dynasty. It describes the king of Balhae, the vassals of Balhae, geography and geology, government system, foods and clothing, etc. It is an early book that argued that Balhae should be included as part of Korean history. Balhaego is notable for referring to Balhae and Silla as the northern and southern kingdoms, within a unified account of Korean history.

The first modern edition was published by the Chōsen Kosho Kankōkai in 1910.

Purpose 
The author criticizes that they did not systematically describe the history of the invention during the Goryeo Dynasty. The front of the book argues that Balhae's history should be accepted into the Korean history system. He made it clear that Balhae was the heir of Goguryeo, and brought it into the category of Korean folk history, and argued that the period of war with Silla should be regarded as the era of the Republic of South Korea.

He also claimed that because Goryeo did not publish the history of the project, he could not claim the territorial rights of Jurchen and Khitan, which occupied Goguryeo and Balhae. In this regard, Balhaego's historical location is very important.

Contents 
The Balhaego consists of nine parts, including a preface. The monarch part is a kind of a forecastle, documenting the king. The vassal part is written about Balhae's military, scholars, and diplomats. The clothing part deals with the clothing according to the business world, and the market part with the local products. The Korean part contains titles in Balhae, and the national document part consists of the letters from Balhae to Japan. The dependency part states that Balhae was a subordinate state.

A preface to Bak Jega 
Park Je-ga, a practical scholar of Bukhakpa during the reign of King Jeongjo of the Joseon Dynasty, wrote about his friend, Ryu Deukgong, saying, "This book is in line with his previous reviews."

References

Joseon dynasty works
History books about Korea